St. Giles' Church, Cromwell is a parish church in the Church of England in Cromwell, Nottinghamshire.

The church is Grade I listed by the Department for Digital, Culture, Media and Sport as a building of outstanding architectural or historic interest.

History
The church was medieval but restored in 1873 to 1876 by Ewan Christian. The church is largely 13th century with the tower being built around 1427.

Pipe Organ
The church has a small single manual pipe organ. A specification of the organ can be found on the National Pipe Organ Register

Current parish status
It is in a group of parishes which includes:
St. Andrew's Church, Caunton
St. Giles' Church, Cromwell
Holy Rood Church, Ossington
St. Laurence's Church, Norwell

Sources

Church of England church buildings in Nottinghamshire
Grade I listed churches in Nottinghamshire
13th-century church buildings in England